Manticora scabra is a species of tiger beetle native to Mozambique, Transvaal and Zimbabwe.

Conservation 
M. scabra beetles, as well as other species in the same genus, are known to be widely collected for the pet and collection trade, which may negatively affect the wild population. As of 2010, M. scabra is not considered vulnerable in South Africa

References

External links
Manticora scabra at Beetles of Africa

Cicindelidae
Beetles described in 1849
Taxa named by Johann Christoph Friedrich Klug
Beetles of Africa
Insects of Southern Africa
Insects of Mozambique
Insects of South Africa
Insects of Zimbabwe